Zygmunt Modzelewski (15 April 1900, Częstochowa – 18 June 1954, Warsaw) was a Polish communist politician, professor, economist, and diplomat.

Life and career 
He was a member of the Social Democracy of the Kingdom of Poland and Lithuania and Communist Party of Poland. From 1923 to 1937, he was a member of the French Communist Party and even joined its Central Committee. In 1937 he moved to the Soviet Union and was arrested by NKVD in the same year in the Great Purge. Despite torture he refused to give false confession and was released in 1939. Later, he joined the Union of Polish Patriots and the Central Bureau of Polish Communists and became the first director of Polpress, a precursor to the Polish Press Agency. He joined the Polish Workers' Party in 1944 (and later its successor, the Polish United Workers' Party) and eventually became the member of its Central Committee. He was also a member of the Polish Council of State and a deputy to the State National Council and Legislative Sejm. He was also a Polish delegate at the session of the Preparatory Commission of the United Nations. Involved in the work of the Slavic Committee in Poland. From 1947 to 1951 he was the Minister of Foreign Affairs. From 1951, rector of the Institute of Social Sciences of the Central Committee of the Polish United Workers' Party.

He received the Order of the Builders of People's Poland. He was also the adoptive father of Karol Modzelewski.

References
  Biuro Edukacji Publicznej IPN "Zygmunt Modzelewski (1900–1954)" – informacja historyczna

1900 births
1954 deaths
People from Częstochowa
People from Piotrków Governorate
Social Democracy of the Kingdom of Poland and Lithuania politicians
Communist Party of Poland politicians
Polish Workers' Party politicians
Polish United Workers' Party members
Members of the State National Council
Members of the Polish Sejm 1947–1952
Members of the Polish Sejm 1952–1956
Diplomats of the Polish People's Republic
Ambassadors of Poland to the Soviet Union
Members of the Polish Academy of Sciences
Commanders with Star of the Order of Polonia Restituta
Recipients of the Order of the Builders of People's Poland
Recipients of the Order of the Cross of Grunwald, 3rd class
Recipients of the Order of the Banner of Work
Grand Crosses of the Order of the White Lion
Burials at Powązki Military Cemetery
Ministers of Foreign Affairs of Poland
Members of the Central Committee of the Polish United Workers' Party
Polish diplomats
Polish Marxists
20th-century Polish philosophers
Polish economists